Don Max is an Indian film director and editor, who works mainly in Malayalam cinema along with Tamil and Telugu language films. He is considered one of the leading contemporary film editors in the Malayalam film industry, and has introduced several new editing techniques into the regional films.

Early life
Don Max was born on 16 November 1980 in Mundakayam, Kottayam District , Kerala , as the eldest child of K. L. Varghese, a former bank manager at SBT, and T. V. Chinamma, who was a teacher in Malayalam at St. Thomas High School in Anikkad. He was born on the same day the Malayalam action star Jayan died. After spending his first seven years in the Idukki district, his family shifted to Pallickathode, Anickad. He grew up in the town and studied at St. Thomas, Anickad. He later studied his pre-degree education at St. Dominic College in Kanjirapilly, before graduating with a Bachelor of Arts degree from St. Thomas College, Palai. He later did a Diploma in Multimedia and Animation at Arena Animations, Bangalore and specialized in Compositing and Animation.

Career
Beginning his career as an editor for ad films and television channels, Don initially focussed on animation, before realising that he would have a more fulfilling career as an editor the possibilities in editing. He joined Ketan Mehta’s Institute and then worked in the Prime Time channel in Dubai, before beginning working as an editor for the Malayalam channel, Kairali.

Don subsequently did trailers for more than fifty films, before debuting as a senior editor through Shaji Kailas’s The Tiger (2005). Don experimented with doing editing at the location, becoming one of the first Malayalam editors to do so, while he also did editing for V. K. Prakash’s Moonnamathoral (2006), the first digital cinema in Malayalam.

He simultaneously worked on Tamil film projects and worked on big budget films such as Aadhavan (2009), Sura (2010) and Ponnar Shankar (2011). Don also garnered positive reviews for his work in Jilla (2014), with a critic from Indiaglitz.com noting "Don Max sure is a gifted editor" and "has a very rich taste, evidently shown through the methods he used to connect the scenes". In late 2014, he began his first directorial venture with actor Anoop Menon in the lead role, and released his debut movie 10 Kalpanakal in 25 November 2016.

Filmography

References

External links
 

Living people
People from Kottayam district
Malayalam film editors
Tamil film editors
Telugu film editors
Film editors from Kerala
1980 births